Caurel is the name of the following communes of France:

 Caurel, Côtes-d'Armor, in the Côtes-d'Armor department
 Caurel, Marne, in the Marne department